Moradi may refer to:

Places
Moradi, Bushehr, a village in Bushehr Province, Iran
Moradi, Hormozgan, a village in Hormozgan Province, Iran
Moradi, Kohgiluyeh and Boyer-Ahmad, a village in Kohgiluyeh and Boyer-Ahmad Province, Iran

Other uses
Moradi (surname)

See also
Moradei
Morandi
Mouradian (disambiguation)